The Traditional Presbyterian Church in Brazil was founded on September 12, 1992. It separated from the Presbyterian Church of Brazil because of the charismatic teaching and liturgical practice of that denomination. The Traditional Presbyterians subscribes the Westminster Confession of Faith, and does not allow during worship instrumental music, except of piano, no lifting the hands, speaking languages, wearing vigils strange costumes. Bible study has an important role in the church.

References 

Presbyterian denominations in South America